The Spoilers is a 1955 American Western film directed by Jesse Hibbs and starring Anne Baxter, Jeff Chandler and Rory Calhoun. Set in Nome, Alaska during the 1898 Gold Rush, it culminates in a spectacular saloon fistfight between Glennister (Chandler) and McNamara (Calhoun).

Film versions also appeared in 1914, 1923 (with Noah Beery, Sr. as McNamara), 1930 (with Gary Cooper as Glennister and Betty Compson as Malotte), and 1942 (with John Wayne as Glennister, Betty Compson lookalike Marlene Dietrich as Malotte, and Randolph Scott as McNamara). The 1930 and 1942 versions were the only instances of Gary Cooper and John Wayne playing the same role in the same story in two different films; Jeff Chandler portrays the part in this version.

Plot 
Struggling miners Flapjack and Banty go to the office of Alex McNamara, the new gold commissioner in Nome, Alaska, to complain about claim jumpers. He isn't there, so they drown their sorrows at Cherry Malotte's gambling house and saloon.

Cherry looks ready to steal the men's claim herself in Alex's office when he suddenly appears. He assures her Judge Stillman is on his way to Nome to review all legal matters regarding the mines.

When a ship arrives bringing her sweetheart Roy Glennister back to town, Cherry runs out eagerly to meet it, to the jealousy of Blackie, her  croupier. To her anger, Roy is traveling with an attractive stranger, Helen Chester. An irate Cherry leaves in a huff with Roy's co-owner of a nearby mine, Dextry.

Roy insists he still loves Cherry, but she slaps his face. Alex and the newly arrived Judge Stillman set out to survey and inspect Roy's mine, insisting it will take weeks before any claims can be settled. Roy is shocked to observe that Alex, the Judge and Helen are all conspirators to steal the miners' claims.

Blackie shoots the town marshal and makes sure Roy is blamed and arrested for it. A jailbreak is arranged, but Cherry rushes to warn Roy of what she has learned from Helen, that as soon as he escapes, Alex is planning to ambush Roy and make it look like a lawful shooting.

A shootout between Alex and the miners ensues. Blackie dies, but not before confessing to the sheriff's murder, while Roy and Alex end up in a knockdown, drag-out fistfight. Cherry and Roy ultimately end up happily in love and in legal possession of the mine.

Cast 
 Anne Baxter as Cherry Malotte
 Jeff Chandler as Roy Glennister
 Rory Calhoun as Alexander McNamara
 Ray Danton as Blackie
 Barbara Britton as Helen Chester
 John McIntire as Dextry
 Wallace Ford as Flapjack Simms
 Forrest Lewis as Banty Jones
 Carl Benton Reid as Judge Stillman
 Raymond Walburn as Mr. Skinner
 Ruth Donnelly as Duchess
 Dayton Lummis as Wheaton
 Willis Bouchey as Jonathan Struve
 Roy Barcroft as the Marshal
 Byron Foulger as Montrose aka Monty
 Robert Foulk as Bartender
 Arthur Space as Bank Manager
 Harry Seymour as Piano Player
 Bob Steele as Miner
 Eddie Parker as Berry (as Edwin Karker)
 Lee Roberts as Deputy
 John Close as Deputy

Production
The film starred Anne Baxter, Jeff Chandler and Rory Calhoun. Robert Arthur was originally to produce and he supervised the script and original casting, but was replaced by Ross Hunter.

See also
 List of American films of 1955

References

External links
 
 
 
 
 

1955 films
Films based on Western (genre) novels
Universal Pictures films
1955 Western (genre) films
Northern (genre) films
Films based on American novels
American films based on plays
Films set in Alaska
Films based on adaptations
Films produced by Ross Hunter
Films directed by Jesse Hibbs
Films based on The Spoilers (Beach novel)
Remakes of American films
1950s English-language films
American Western (genre) films